TRESS 90 (1990–1996) was a Norwegian software project meant to be the replacement for INFOTRYGD, a case-worker support system, used by the Norwegian National Insurance Service.

It is still the largest IT failure in Norwegian history.

Sources 
 June 1995 Government report on TRESS-90 (in Norwegian)

Government of Norway